Gymnasium Allee is a school in form of a German "Gymnasium" in Hamburg-Altona-Nord. Founded in 1876 as a school for higher girls education, it is being used for both boys and girls since 1972. During the school year 2012/2013 794 pupils were educated by 75 teachers.

Famous pupils 
 Karin Hardt (1910–1992), Actress
 Dr. Hiltgunt Zassenhaus (1916–2004), „Der Engel von Fuhlsbüttel“, Doctor
 Dr. Julia Dingwort-Nusseck (born 1921), President of LZB Niedersachsen i.R.
 Marianne Tidick (born 1942), Politician (SPD), Minister a.D.
 Britta Ernst (born 1961), Politician (SPD)
 Matthias Glasner (born 1965), Movie Director
 Ayşe Polat (born 1970), Movie Director and Author
 Aygül Özkan (born 1971), Politician (CDU), Ministerin a.D.
 Fatih Akın (born 1973), Movie Director, Author, Actor and Producer
 Adam Bousdoukos (born 1974), Actor
 Zlatan Bajramović (born 1979), Football Player
 Ivan Klasnić (born 1980), Football Player
 Asmaa Safer (born 2006)

External links 

 Official Website

Schools in Hamburg
Buildings and structures in Altona, Hamburg